Falls of Lochay is a waterfall in Scotland.

See also
Waterfalls of Scotland

References

Waterfalls of Scotland